Elyse Iller is a soccer player who plays for Kent State and the United States Virgin Islands women's national soccer team.

Career

College and youth 
Prior to college, Iller captained Henry B. Plant High School in Tampa, Florida. She also played for Tampa Bay United Rowdies.

Iller verbally committed to Kent State via her Twitter account on 7 October 2020.

She made her debut for the Golden Flashes on 26 August 2021 in a 4-1 win vs. Youngstown State, playing 3 minutes as a late sub.

International 
Iller made her debut for the U.S. Virgin Islands on 2 October 2019 in a 4-1 loss vs. Saint Lucia.

References 

Living people
2002 births
Women's association football defenders
United States Virgin Islands women's soccer players
United States Virgin Islands women's international soccer players
Kent State Golden Flashes women's soccer players